Corinne Michelle West (1908–1991) was an American painter; she also used the names Mikael and Michael West. She was an Abstract Expressionist.

Life 
Corinne Michelle West was born in Chicago, Illinois. She attended the Cincinnati Conservatory of Music before moving to the Cincinnati Art Academy in 1925. She graduated from the Cincinnati Art Academy in 1930. West – on June 26, 1930, at the Wesley Chapel in Cincinnati – married theatre actor Randolph Nelson (1909–1978).

West moved to New York in 1932. She began to study painting with Hans Hoffman at the Art Student's League of New York and commercial art at the Traphagen School of Fashion. After graduating and leaving the teachings of Hofmann, in 1934, West began studying under Raphael Soyer. She was Arshile Gorky's muse and probably his lover, although she refused to marry him when he proposed several times. They shared a passion for art and visited museums and galleries together.

West's paintings in the mid-1930s through the mid-1940s were Cubist and Neo-Cubist in style.  In 1936 she had her first solo exhibition, at the Rochester Art Club; also in 1936, she had begun to go by Mikael to obtain better opportunities, and after Arshile Gorky told her that the name "Corinne" sounded like that of a "debutante's daughter." Gorky's suggestion however, was based on a real prejudice against women in the art world, such as with George Sand and George Elliot. In 1941 she began to use the name Michael, which she used in her regular life as well as her painting. In 1946, after returning to New York from Rochester, she exhibited at the Pinacotheca Gallery alongside Mark Rothko and Adolph Gottlieb. West – on June 30, 1948, in Manhattan – married filmmaker Francis Lee; they divorced in 1960.

West was one of the few female members of the New York Art School movement. In creating her work, West was inspired by the existentialist writer Henri Bergson's theory of 'living energy' and was guided by her instinctive creativity and passion. During the 1950s, she was committed to action painting, as shown in works like Space Poetry (1956). She exhibited in Manhattan's prestigious Stable Gallery in 1953, and had a solo show in 1957 at the Uptown Gallery in New York City. In 1958 she had a one-woman show at the Domino Gallery in Georgetown, Washington, D.C.

In the 1960s and 1970s, West held three solo exhibitions at the Granite Gallery, Imaginary Art, and Woman Art Gallery, all in New York. Her style in these years became more experimental, with West exploring collage, calligraphy, and staining techniques.

West also wrote poems; she wrote a series of 50 poems in the 1940s, including the poem The New Art in 1942. Later in 1968 she created a series of poem-paintings related to the Vietnam war.

West died in 1991 in New York. Five years after her death, a retrospective of her work was held at the Pollock-Krasner House. The first major West Coast exhibit of her work was held posthumously at Art Resource Group's Newport Beach, California gallery in 2010.

Exhibits held after death 
 1996
 “Other Artists of the 50s”    
 Kendall Campus Art Gallery
 Miami-Dade Community College Miami, FL
 Pollock-Krasner House and Study Center New York, NY
 1999
 Michael West: Automatic Paintings
 123 Watts Gallery, New York, NY
 2001
 “Second to None: Six Artists of New York School"
 Thomas McCormick Gallery, Chicago, IL
 2005
 "Rapt in the New York School"
 The Studio Armonk, NY
 2007-2008
 "Suitcase Paintings Small scale Abstract Expressionism"
 Georgia Museum of Art, Athens, GA
 Ball State University Museum of Art, Muncie, IN
 Utah Museum of Fine Art, Salt Lake City, UT
 Sydney Mishkin Gallery, Baruch College, New York, NY
 Greenville County Museum of Art, Greenville, SC
 Loyola University Museum of Art, Chicago, IL

Notable works

Harlequin (1946) 
Corrine Michelle West is considered one of the pioneers of Abstract Expressionism, a style commonly associated with Willem de Kooning and the Action Paintings of Jackson Pollock. Inspired by Parisian philosopher Henri Bergson’s theory of “living energy” and the new spirituality to come out of post-war American art, West adopted a style that can be described as Neo-Cubist, using heavy painterly brushstrokes to bring movement to the canvas. In an essay from January 1946, she says, “The new peace has brought about a world of opening facts — and a speed which causes change both of matter and a way of doing things — a different system — the world by the artist is sudden viewed and felt in a new way." With Harlequin, West investigated “art as process” and her expressive abstractions became more aggressive action paintings. She painted over Harlequin in the 1950s stating the overpainting was her response to the destruction of the Atomic Bomb and the tensions arising from the Cold War.

References

20th-century American painters
American women painters
Abstract expressionist artists
Traphagen School of Fashion alumni
Art Students League of New York alumni
1908 births
1991 deaths
Painters from New York City
20th-century American women artists
20th-century American people